The sliteye shark (Loxodon macrorhinus) is a species of requiem shark, in the family Carcharhinidae, and the only member of its genus. It is found in the tropical waters of the Indo-West Pacific between latitudes 34° N and 30° S, from depths of 7 to 100 m. It can reach a length of about 95 cm.

References

sliteye shark
Viviparous fish
Marine fauna of East Africa
Fish of the Indian Ocean
sliteye shark
sliteye shark